John Morris Duncan  (born December 19, 1948) is a Canadian politician.  He served as a Member of the Parliament of Canada from 1993 to January 2006 and again from October 2008 until August 2015. On August 6, 2010, he was appointed to the Canadian Cabinet as Minister of Aboriginal Affairs and Northern Development, Federal Interlocutor for Métis and Non-Status Indians, and Minister responsible for the Canadian Northern Economic Development Agency until his resignation on February 15, 2013 over his inappropriate written communication to the Tax Court of Canada.  He later returned to Cabinet as Chief Government Whip, and served in that capacity until the 2015 election, which saw both Duncan's own defeat and the defeat of the government.

Education
Born in Winnipeg, Manitoba, and raised in British Columbia, Duncan attended the University of British Columbia and graduated with a B.Sc. F from their Faculty of Forestry in 1972. Duncan's first experience as an elected official was as an alderman in Ucluelet, British Columbia from 1982–83.

Entrance to politics
In the 1993 election, Duncan was elected as a member of the Reform Party. He has served in all that party's incarnations up until the 2006 federal election, when he lost his seat to Catherine J. Bell of the New Democratic Party by 630 votes.

Duncan was the Conservative Party's Official Opposition Critic for Natural Resources.  During that time he served on the Natural Resources Committee.  He helped shape Conservative Party policy on west coast offshore oil and gas, softwood lumber trade and the pine beetle epidemic.

While in parliament, he was a member of the "Restaurant Caucus" in the House of Commons, a group of MPs who have interests in the restaurant industry.

Duncan's Private Member's Bill C - 259 passed the 38th Parliament to receive Royal Assent to eliminate the excise tax on jewelry.  Duncan made parliamentary history as the first MP to have a Private Member's bill related to cutting taxation pass.

He won the Vancouver Island North Conservative Party nomination for the 2008 federal election and was elected with 45.78% of the vote.

On December 2, 2008, the New Democratic Party asked the RCMP to investigate John Duncan's alleged secret recording of a private NDP conference. He had apparently received the invitation to participate by mistake, in place of NDP MP Linda Duncan who had "a similar email address". This happened within the context of the 2008–09 Canadian parliamentary dispute.

On August 6, 2010, in a minor cabinet shuffle, he joined cabinet as Minister of Aboriginal Affairs and Northern Development.

Under the Harper government, several key bills with a direct effect on aboriginal communities have stalled. As a result, First Nations across Canada have embarked on a widespread and prolonged series of demonstrations under the banner of "Idle No More." In addition, Attawapiskat chief Theresa Spence began a fast in December 2012 to demand a meeting with Harper and a Crown representative. 
In response, Duncan wrote to Spence requesting she give up her hunger strike and meet with him. "I didn’t ask for Minister Duncan," Spence replied. "And I have dealt with him before. When I observe him, he doesn't have a mind of his own because, before he would answer a question, he would always look at his people. He's not the Prime Minister."

On February 15, 2013, he resigned from his cabinet position as Minister of Aboriginal Affairs and Northern Development after improperly advocating to a tax court on behalf of a constituent in June 2011, and was replaced by James Moore. He returned to cabinet in the more junior role as Minister of State and Chief Government Whip in July 2013.

In the 2015 Canadian federal election, Duncan sought reelection in the newly created riding of Courtenay—Alberni, but was defeated by Gord Johns of the NDP.

Electoral record

References

External links
Official site

1948 births
Living people
Members of the 28th Canadian Ministry
Members of the House of Commons of Canada from British Columbia
Reform Party of Canada MPs
Canadian Alliance MPs
Conservative Party of Canada MPs
People from Courtenay, British Columbia
Politicians from Winnipeg
University of British Columbia alumni
Members of the King's Privy Council for Canada